Lepidasthenia elegans is a species of scaled Polychaete worms in the family Polynoidae. It is found in the Mediterranean Sea.

References

External links 

Phyllodocida
Animals described in 1840
Taxa named by Adolph Eduard Grube